Pandeidae is a family of hydroids in the class Hydrozoa. Like other jellyfish there is usually a mature medusa form which is pelagic and reproduces sexually and a hydroid or polyp form which is often benthic and reproduces asexually by budding.

Characteristics
Members of this family have bell-shaped medusae with a four-part manubrium or sub-umbrella, a mouth with four plain or pleated lips and four, often broad, radial canals. The gonads are smooth or folded and positioned on the walls of the manubrium and sometimes extend onto the radial canals. There are fine, hollow tentacles along the margin of the bell, mostly growing from small carrot-shaped bulbs. The hydroids have threadlike tentacles.

Genera
The World Register of Marine Species recognises the following genera:
Amphinema Haeckel, 1879
Annatiara Russell, 1940
Barnettia Schuchert, 1996
Catablema Haeckel, 1879
Cirrhitiara Hartlaub, 1914
Eutiara Bigelow, 1918
Geomackiea Mills, 1985
Halitholus Hartlaub, 1913
Hydrichthys Fewkes, 1887
Larsonia Boero, Bouillon & Gravili, 1991
Leuckartiara Hartlaub, 1914
Merga Hartlaub, 1914
Neoturris Hartlaub, 1914
Nudiclava Lloyd, 1907
Octotiara Kramp, 1953
Pandea Lesson, 1843
Pandeopsis Kramp, 1959
Pelagiana Borstad & Brinckmann-Voss, 1979
Perigonella Stechow, 1921
Stomotoca L. Agassiz, 1862
Timoides Bigelow, 1904
Zanclonia Hartlaub, 1914

References

 
Filifera
Taxa named by Ernst Haeckel
Cnidarian families